The Stevens Pass Ski Area is a ski area in the northwest United States, located at the crest of Stevens Pass in the Cascade Range of Washington. Total skiable terrain includes 37 major runs covering .

Alpine skiing 
Stevens Pass offers a variety of alpine ski runs ranging from beginner to advanced. Without lodging at its base, Stevens is a day resort, drawing heavily from the Seattle-Everett metropolitan area, via U.S. Route 2. Night skiing is offered until 10 pm most days (except Mondays and Tuesdays) during mid-season.

The area is divided into front (north and east facing) and back (south facing) sides.

Front side 
From the base area, there is direct access to the chairlifts Daisy, Hogsback, Brooks, Skyline, and Kehr's:

 Kehr's (formerly Big Chief) is a fixed double below Big Chief Mountain, providing access to a very consistent cruiser with small bumps on the left side and an ungroomed steep bump slope leading to a valley on the right side.
 Daisy is a beginner's quad lift that offers access to beginner terrain directly in the middle of the ski area. (There is also a conveyor belt (aka "magic carpet") lift in the beginner area at the base of Daisy.)
 Hogsback is a high-speed quad providing access to intermediate runs and some more advanced tree runs, along with the terrain parks.
 Skyline is a high-speed quad that offers the longest intermediate and advanced runs on the front side of the mountain.
 Brooks is a high-speed quad lift that primarily provides access to beginner-intermediate terrain.

There are also 3 higher chairlifts on the front side:

 Seventh Heaven is a fixed double experts-only lift that accesses double-black diamond runs and backcountry access near the top of Cowboy Mountain. It is accessed by the Skyline lift.
 Tye Mill is a fixed triple that provides access to the backside and to intermediate and advanced runs and is accessed by the Hogsback lift or Seventh Heaven chair.
 Double Diamond is a fixed triple that provides access to the backside and also to Double Diamond, Big Chief Bowl, and Wild Katz, all experts-only extra-steep ungroomed runs. It is accessed by Kehr's Chair.

Back side 
The backside (named Mill Valley) provides a more natural environment with many sparsely treed runs. The backside features two lifts loading from the same immediate area:

 Jupiter Express - a high-speed quad that unloads next to the top of Tye Mill.
 Southern Cross - a fixed triple that is the same physical lift as Double Diamond on the frontside.

Cross-country skiing 
The Stevens Pass Nordic Center provides access to 28 km of groomed cross-country ski trails of varying difficulty.

Management 
May 2022-Current  - Ellen Galbraith 

Jan 2022-May 2022  - Tom Fortune 

Sept 2018-Jan 2022 - Tom Pettigrew

Criticism
Employees and season pass holders have blamed Stevens Pass management and parent company Vail for “dysfunctional” conditions at the ski area since it opened for the winter season on Dec. 15 2021.  Frustrated customers have filed complaints with the Washington Attorney General’s Office and have accused Vail Resorts of violating consumer protection laws by overselling season passes while failing to keep lifts running at Stevens Pass and some of its other ski areas.  A Change.Org online petition called "Hold Vail Resorts Accountable", which garnered nearly 40,000 signatures in two weeks, called on Vail Resorts to address the problems at Stevens Pass by Jan. 15 or commit to a 60% refund to season pass holders.

History 
The ski resort was started in the winter of 1937–38 by Don Adams and Bruce Kehr, both passionate skiers. The original lodge was constructed in 1937, burned down in 1939, and was rebuilt the next year by the Civilian Conservation Corps (CCC), a government-funded work force.

In 2011, Harbor Resorts after 35 years of ownership sold Stevens Pass to CNL Lifestyle; operations were turned over to the operator of Mountain High in California. In 2016, CNL sold Stevens Pass to Och-Ziff Capital Management. On August 15, 2018, Vail Resorts completed its acquisition of Stevens Pass.

Avalanches

The area around Stevens Pass is known to be avalanche prone, having experienced the most deadly avalanche in U.S. history in 1910, when two trains, stationary due to heavy snowfall, were swept off the tracks and buried, killing 96 people.

More than a century later in 2012, another notable avalanche occurred. Out of a group of 16 experienced skiers, three men, Chris Rudolph, age 30; Johnny Brenan, 41, and Jim Jack, age 46; were killed in an avalanche at Stevens Pass on February 19. The avalanche occurred in an unmaintained back-country area known as Tunnel Creek, which was described as "ski at your own risk," after  of fresh snowfall.

Future development plans
The growth of population in the Seattle area has led to increased use at all the Cascades ski areas in Washington, and Stevens pass frequently reaches capacity on weekends during January and February. In June 2007, a Master Plan was submitted to the Forest Service describing proposed future expansions and upgrades over the next ten years.

Development objectives
 Improve the mountain experience at Stevens Pass by diversifying its terrain offering, including a variety of trail width and aspect, as well as gladed terrain of varying difficulty.
 Increase the Comfortable Carrying Capacity of both the ski trails and the ski lifts to better match actual demand, making use of the majority of skiable terrain that is now underdeveloped.
 Balance the ski terrain skill max to match the market, within the limitations imposed by the Stevens Pass terrain.
 Provide additional 'in-bounds' and 'hike to' adventure skiing opportunities.
 Provide a diverse range of gladed and other off-piste skiing possibilities.
 Better manage lift accessed backcountry use.
 Improve guest satisfaction through lift and trail system upgrades.
 Relieve pressure and congestion in the base area with the establishment of on-mountain facilities.
 Develop new terrain, as well as re-groom (grade) and re-vegetate existing terrain, with climate change predictions and Visual Quality Objectives in mind.
 Provide a small-scale snowmaking system focused on the super-pipe and facilities near the base area.
 Design new terrain development to bring a net gain in forest health and diversity with the SUP area.
 Develop a summer lift accessed Mountain Bike product to satisfy a growing demand, as well as other related, appropriate outdoor activities.
 Plan for and develop other mountain products and facilities as use increases.

Front side
A northern exposure area is planned to the left (east) of the current Big Chief lift, with a Northern Exposure detachable quad providing access to runs and glade skiing. This expansion would add  of total terrain.

Brooks has been upgraded from a double to a high speed quad, opening fall of 2019.

Daisy has been upgraded from a triple to a fixed grip quad, also opening fall of 2019.

A Grace Lakes area is planned to the right of the top of Brooks, heading off downhill to the right (north), consisting of groomed cruisers and gladed runs. The area would be served by a fixed quad lift, and add  of total terrain.  Additionally, there would be new adventure runs from the top of skyline down into the Grace Lakes area.

Big Chief would be upgraded to a fixed quad, and the loading area would be moved slightly down the mountain to improve access.

A new fixed quad "The Katz" would be added to the right of Big Chief, extending up and to the right.

Back Side
Backside improvements happen at the right (east) side. To the immediate right of Southern Cross, new trails and glades provide expanded area, and a proposed permit expansion into Highlands Bowl to the right of that would provide a backcountry experience for those willing to do some hiking. A catch trail at the bottom would return to Southern Cross. This expansion would add  of terrain.

There are no lift changes planned on the backside, other than the installation of the Jupiter Express  which was carried out in 2013.

Base area and facilities
Solitude lodge would be constructed near the top end of Skyline.

Smaller yurts would be constructed at the top of Tye mill, at the top of the terrain park, and at the base of the lifts in the back.

The base lodges would be expanded and reconfigured.

A new mini-lodge and ticket area would be constructed at the base of the Northern exposure lift.

470 new parking places would be added.

References

External links 
 
 
 
 

Ski areas and resorts in Washington (state)
Buildings and structures in King County, Washington
Tourist attractions in King County, Washington